The Dutch Basketball League Coach of the Year is an award given to the best coach in the Dutch highest professional basketball league. The award is given after the regular season and was first handed out in 1975 to Bill Sheridan.

Winners

Awards per coach

References

European basketball awards
Dutch Basketball League awards
Basketball coaching awards
Dutch sports trophies and awards